is a fictional character in Nintendo's Kirby video game series created by Masahiro Sakurai and developed by HAL Laboratory. Dedede first appeared in the 1992 video game Kirby's Dream Land as the main antagonist, but gradually became an antihero of the series. He has returned for all other games of the series except Kirby & the Amazing Mirror (2004) and Kirby and the Rainbow Curse (2015). He has also appeared in several Kirby comic books, the 2001 anime series Kirby: Right Back at Ya! and the Super Smash Bros. video game series (specifically Super Smash Bros. Brawl and all subsequent installments).

King Dedede is the archrival and ally of Kirby, described as his "arch frenemy". Dedede often battled against Kirby and filled the role of an antagonist in the past, but notably grew out of this behavior in later installments of the series, started to willingly work with Kirby to fight greater threats together (such as in Kirby 64: The Crystal Shards, Kirby: Triple Deluxe) and work towards keeping Dream Land safe as king. In a majority of his antagonistic roles after Kirby's Dream Land, he is either controlled against his will (such as in Kirby's Dream Land 2, 3, Kirby Star Allies) or revealed to have unexpectedly heroic motives, such as breaking the Star Rod in order to keep the people of Dream Land protected (such as in Kirby's Adventure).

Characteristics
King Dedede is a rotund, blue penguin bird who dresses in a red, regal coat with white fur trim and his personal emblem, a stylized version of his hand striking the V sign, embossed on the back. He also wears yellow mitten-like gloves, a red tuque with a white fur pom-pom and gold crown-like brim, a red and yellow zigzag-patterned sash, and a buff-colored sleeveless undershirt. Dedede's giant wooden mallet is his signature weapon, depicted in some games as having special features built into it, such as a powerful jet engine, precision bearings and, in Kirby: Triple Deluxe, a chargeable laser cannon used for shooting at targets from afar.

Like Kirby, King Dedede can inhale objects and spit them out with tremendous force, and he can breathe in huge amounts of air at once to hover and/or fly. Unlike Kirby, though, he is unable to capture abilities from inhaled enemies. King Dedede's antagonism and role played varies between games, ranging from selfishness to friendly competition to teamwork. However, in Kirby: Right Back at Ya!, King Dedede makes multiple attempts to terrorize his townsfolk. For example, in the very first episode, he buys a octopus monster that eats many of Mayor Blustergas's sheep but then denies it.

Appearances

In the Kirby video game series
King Dedede is introduced to the series as the main antagonist of the game Kirby's Dream Land (1992), in which he steals Dream Land's food supply, prompting Kirby to travel to his castle and confront him. In Kirby's Adventure (1993) and its remake Kirby: Nightmare in Dream Land (2002), King Dedede breaks the Star Rod, the source of all dreams, into seven pieces, preventing the inhabitants of Dream Land from having dreams. Kirby defeats King Dedede, but unbeknownst to Kirby, he is only the penultimate boss and broke the Star Rod to keep the villainous Nightmare sealed in the Fountain of Dreams. Dedede then briefly assists Kirby in defeating Nightmare and stopping his plot against Dream Land. In Kirby's Dream Land 2 (1995), King Dedede appears as the penultimate boss, and fights while possessed by a spirit-like entity known as Dark Matter, the game's true final boss. In Kirby Super Star (1996), Dedede reprises his role from Kirby's Dream Land in the "Spring Breeze" game, appears in the "Gourmet Race" and "Samurai Kirby" minigames, and is fought alongside the rest of the game's bosses in the "Arena". Dedede is again possessed by Dark Matter in Kirby's Dream Land 3 (1997), fighting against Kirby as the last boss before the secret Hyper Zone.

King Dedede plays the role of a protagonist in Kirby 64: The Crystal Shards (2000), helping Kirby in certain areas after Kirby once again saves him from possession by Dark Matter, who shattered the titular Crystal. Additionally, King Dedede is a playable character in the game's three minigames. Images of the game's beta show that Dedede was originally a playable character from the game's beginning. In Kirby Tilt 'n' Tumble (2000), Dedede steals all of the stars from the sky for himself and Kirby needs to fight him to get them back. After his absence from Kirby & the Amazing Mirror (2004), King Dedede appears as the first boss in Kirby: Squeak Squad (2006) and is identical to his appearance in previous games, except his new ability to summon Parasol Waddle Dees. In Kirby Super Star Ultra (2008), King Dedede returns in his own game mode, Revenge of The King, which is a spin-off of the Revenge of Meta Knight subgame. Whenever faced off, he dons a new title, Masked Dedede, as he dons a silver mask with 4 horns, and a new hammer that features the ability to shoot missiles and able to spin frantically with the hammer.

King Dedede appears in Kirby's Return to Dream Land (2011) and its 2023 remake as one of the four playable protagonists, alongside Kirby, Meta Knight, and (Bandana) Waddle Dee, and as a playable character in multi-player mode. In Kirby: Triple Deluxe (2014), King Dedede is captured by Taranza, and Kirby gives chase to rescue him until the end of the game, in which Taranza uses his powers to turn him into a puppet-controlled Masked Dedede. Triple Deluxe also features a rhythm-based platforming mode, "Dedede's Drum Dash", in which Dedede is the main character. When the Story Mode is completed, the "Dededetour" mode is unlocked, allowing players to play through the game as King Dedede. Dedede's Drum Dash Deluxe, an enhanced, standalone version of "Dedede's Drum Dash" released on the Nintendo eShop, marks the debut of King Dedede starring in his own game. He appears in the beginning and ending scenes of Kirby: Planet Robobot. Dedede returns as both a boss and playable character in Kirby Star Allies. He returns again as an antagonist in Kirby and the Forgotten Land (2022), having been possessed by the Beast Pack.

King Dedede also appears in several spin-off games in the series. He appears as the final boss in Kirby's Pinball Land (1993). In Kirby's Avalanche (1995), Dedede appears as the final opponent. He appears as the single boss in Kirby's Dream Course (1994), along with a robotic version of himself. In Kirby's Block Ball (1995), he is a hidden final boss. In Kirby's Star Stacker (1997), Dedede appears to antagonize Kirby during the "Round Clear" sub-game, in which Kirby has to completely deplete his hit points in order to move on to the next stage. Additionally, there was a version of the game released only in Japan in 1998 which featured him as the final boss in a short story mode. He is an unlockable character in Kirby Air Ride (2003) and Kirby Canvas Curse (2005). King Dedede is a boss in Kirby's Epic Yarn (2010) and Kirby Mass Attack (2011). Although he is absent from the main story, King Dedede appears in Kirby and the Rainbow Curse (2015) as a collectible figurine. The game is also compatible with the King Dedede amiibo, which Kirby can use for a temporary increase in health. In Kirby's Blowout Blast (2017), although no story is present, he appears as the final boss. Masked Dedede appears as the secret final boss, after completing the game with all Gold trophies.

Other appearances
King Dedede has made several appearances outside of the Kirby video game series. He is featured in every Kirby manga adaptation; the first one was written by Yoshiko Sakuma, and published by Shogakukan originally in 1992, and the most recently is a 2012 Yuki Kawakami manga by Shogakukan, Hoshi no Kirby: Pack to Daibaku Show.

Dedede is a main character in Kirby: Right Back at Ya!, in which he is the ruler of Dream Land who tries to defeat Kirby at any cost, usually by ordering monsters from Nightmare Enterprises (NME).

Dedede has also been featured in the Super Smash Bros. video game series. While originally planned for inclusion in both the first installment of the series and its sequel, he did not appear as a playable character until Super Smash Bros. Brawl (2008). He returned as a playable character in Super Smash Bros. for Nintendo 3DS and Wii U and again in Super Smash Bros. Ultimate. Unlike most heavyweight fighters in the series, his hovering jumps give him great vertical distance in the air.

Reception
Since his first appearance in Kirby's Dream Land, King Dedede has received generally positive reception. GamesRadar included Dedede on their list of "9 video game 'bad guys' who aren't really bad at all", noting that in Kirby: Nightmare in Dream Land, "he actually only committed the 'crime' because he knew that a nightmare had infested the fountain and wanted to stop it from infiltrating the dreams of the country's citizens through the power of the rod." Although Dedede "has historically been the pink puffball's major nemesis", Complex stated his popularity was eventually surpassed by Meta Knight.

In 2007, IGN correctly speculated that King Dedede could appear in a subsequent Super Smash Bros. game, since he "is the classic recurring villain of the Kirby franchise", and his creator, Masahiro Sakurai, is also the game director. UGO Networks remarked that he is "cool" because "he's a hammer-wielding, glove-wearing evil penguin." They also listed the fight against King Dedede in Kirby's Dream Land as the seventh hardest boss battle in video games in their "Top 50". King Dedede has been cited by Yahoo! Voices as one of the top five characters in Super Smash Bros. Brawl. Jeremy Parish of Polygon ranked 73 fighters from Super Smash Bros. Ultimate "from garbage to glorious", listing King Dedede as 50th. Gavin Jasper of Den of Geek ranked King Dedede as ninth on his list of Super Smash Bros. Ultimate characters, stating "Nothing but respect for MY king. In this battle of heroes and villains from so many worlds, there's this guy. This wild card. This corrupt king who is too much of a doofus to be considered evil. This loveable giant who will happily hug you one moment and smash you with a giant mallet the next."

References

Dictator characters in video games
Fictional birds
Fictional kings
Fictional penguins
Video game characters with superhuman strength
King characters in video games
Kirby (series) characters
Male characters in video games
Male video game villains
Extraterrestrial characters in video games
Nintendo antagonists
Nintendo protagonists
Super Smash Bros. fighters
Video game bosses
Video game characters introduced in 1992
Fictional hammer fighters